Gretchen Goes to London is a DVD by King's X, released on Molken Music in 2008. The DVD was recorded on hand held cameras at the Astoria in London, England on May 6, 1990.

Track listing 
 "King"
 "What Is This?"
 "Out of the Silent Planet"
 "Sometimes"
 "Summerland"
 "Fall On Me"
 "Goldilox"
 "Everybody Knows a Little Bit of Something"
 "Over My Head"
 "Mission"

Bonus tracks

 "In the New Age"
 "The Burning Down"

King's X albums
2008 video albums